Estadio Municipal de Chorrillos is a municipal stadium in Lima, Peru. It opened in 1993, and holds 15,000 people. The stadium's nickname is Cancha de los Muertos (Field of the Dead) because the stadium was built over a cemetery. In the 1990s, it was used by Deportivo Municipal as its home venue. The stadium is owned by the Municipalidad of Chorrillos.

References

Municipalidad de Chorrillos
Deportivo Municipal
Sports venues in Lima
Multi-purpose stadiums in Peru